The following are the national records in speed skating in New Zealand maintained by the Ice Speed Skating New Zealand Inc. (ISSNZ).

Men

Women

References

External links
 ISSNZ web site
 New Zealand records

National records in speed skating
Records
Speed skating
Speed skating-related lists
Speed skating